Angadikadavu is a town in Kannur district, Kerala, India. It is near to Karnataka border.

Education
Sacred Heart Schools, Angadikadavu is located in the town.

Transportation
The national highway passes through Kannur town.  Mangalore and Mumbai can be accessed on the northern side and Cochin and Thiruvananthapuram can be accessed on the southern side.  The road to the east of Iritty connects to Mysore and Bangalore.   The nearest railway station is Kannur on Mangalore-Palakkad line. There are airports at Kannur, Mangalore and Calicut.

References

Villages near Iritty